Molly Jackson was acting director of the National Museum of Science and Industry (NMSI) in England, from 6 April to 23 September 2009. From June 2004 she was the managing director of NMSI Trading Ltd. Prior to that (1993 to 2003) she had held a number of roles in Pearson plc, including Development Director of the Financial Times Group.

Jackson was the appointment panel's selection for Director on 7 April, but the appointment had not been confirmed by the time Jackson's contract was terminated following a disciplinary investigation.

She was replaced as acting director by Andrew Scott, former director of NMSI's National Railway Museum.

References 

Year of birth missing (living people)
Living people
British chief executives
Directors of museums in the United Kingdom
Women museum directors
People associated with the Science Museum, London
British women business executives